Nargol (also: Nargole) is a village located in the Indian state of Gujarat.

Geography 
Nargol is sited in Gujarat's southern region near the Maharashtra border.

The Arabian Sea is to the West, Umargam to the south, separated by a river. To the southeast is Sanjan and to the North is Saronda.

The countryside surrounding Nargol is typical Indian countryside dotted with small farmhouses. Around Nargol water buffalos swim in the rivers or sparsely populated quiet landscapes of dry savannah. The beaches are sandy, wide and isolated with a relatively large tidal range and strong tidal currents.

Nargol beach is dotted with Casuarina trees and the waters have a population of sea turtles. The uncrowded beach is rarely visited by locals. It is an interesting holiday destination and sees a few tourists. The seaside is part of the Gulf of Khambhat, which has very cloudy waters with almost no visibility. This is possibly because of the large rivers that bring their runoff to the sea around the bay.

History 
Persians (Zoroastrians) were the first to land on the shores of Nargol. They spread south to Sanjan and north to Udvada.

Nargol has experienced problems with water scarcity and salinity.

UNICEF made efforts to teach village leaders about issues concerning child survival and development.

Jayesh G Baria was elected sarpanch  in 2012. Yatinbhai Bhandari was elected in 2007. The current Sarpanch of Nargol is Sweety Ben Yatinbhai Bhandari(village head)in 2022. She is the wife of former Sarpanch Yatinbhai Bhandari.

Gujarat government approved the 4000 crore Nargol port, followed by protests led by Baria for harming local fishermen. Baria wrote to the Gujarat Maritime Board to understand the plan for the port.

Economy 
Traditional small fishing boats patrol the coast in search of fish.

Climate 
Nargol has a tropical climate with average monthly temperatures ranging between 28 °C and 33 °C year-round.

Nargol is a small town with houses not visited by owners.

Marine geography 
An ancient city 20–40 meters under the sea was reported in the year 2000. Thought to be over 9000 years old, it was discovered 20 kilometers off the coast in an area with numerous geometric formations. The 9 km long area forms the basis of marine archaeology in the Gulf of Cambay. Its status as a major archeological discovery is disputed and studies have yet to be completed. The area is very risky and difficult to excavate because of the water depth, strong currents and poor visibility.

Transport 
The nearest airports are Daman and Surat.  The nearest railway station is Sanjan, (about 11 kilometres from the village) with frequent train connections to Mumbai in the south and Gujarat in the north.

Sports
Nargol is developed in the field of sports. Cricket and Hockey are most of the games played over here. There are big grounds to play cricket, hockey and many other games. On 4 5 6 of 2013 there was an Open Hockey Tournament, which was first time in Gujarat, organised by Sarpanch Jayesh Baria and Nargol Hockey Club. There are many State Tournaments held every year.

Education
Nargol had one of the finest Fine Art Colleges, once covering around 500 students in campus till 2007. The College is located at the center of Nargol, in the Campus of Tata Wadia High School. Covering  ATD as well as Textile Division. N.M. Wadia (TATA Wadia) High School of Nargol covering around a thousand students was built in 1908 by Nargol Parsi Association and was also known for giving some of the best Hockey players for Valsad District Hockey Team.

Nargol has 7 schools for children: Dakshina Vidalaya (established 2014, grades 1 to 5), Navatadav Pra. Shala (established 1928, grades 1 to 5), N.M.Wadia Tata Wadia (established 1908, grades 6 to 12), Bhakta Shri Jalaram New School (established 1943, grades 6 to 12),Pra. Shala Saronda (established 1867, grades 1 to 8, Gujarati Pra. Mukhya Shala (established 1983, grades 1 to 8) Pra. Shala Nargol-Machhiwad (established 1918, grades 1 to 8).

Two of them are high schools: N. M. Wadia Tata-Wadia High School Nargol and Bhakta Shree Jalaram New High School.

Religious activities

As so often in India, different religious communities have their importance in the local area.

The town is especially known for its Parsi (Zoroastrian) population. Legends also tell that Zoroastrians first came to India from Nargol in the 7th century.

Near the beach is an Agiary (or fire temple, which is the place of worship for parsis) often visited by the Parsi's who often come to this village from Mumbai and other nearby places to visit the places of worship, like Udwada which is renowned for Iranshah Ātash Bahrām, one of the oldest and most famous of the Parsi fire temples.[in the world?] In the village there is also a Parsi Association Guest House.

Nargol has great importance for the followers of Sahaja Yoga. One of the Casuarina tree (or Saru tree) is called "Nirmal Tree" ("Nirmal Wriksh"). The tree is a local sight and can be found nearby the beach. According to the founder and spiritual leader of Sahaja Yoga, Shri Mataji Nirmala Devi, the Sahasrara chakra was claimed to be opened in Nargol in the year 1970 under that tree, thus marking the beginning of Sahaja Yoga. The forest land surrounding "Nirmal Tree" has been declared and inaugurated as "Nirmal Van" ("Pure Forest") in an official ceremony on 2 March 2009 by representatives of the Indian government and other state authorities.
The Forest Department protects it as Eco - Zone under, JFMC (South Valsad Forest Division of Gujarat State) for promotion of environmental awareness, ecotourism and peace project.

In Nargol there is also the  Sri Auromira international school (SAIS), which is a base for the followers of Sri Aurobindo. The school was a boarding school with ideals of finding the learning potential of each and every child in a perfect harmonious environment with Aurobindo's spiritual teachings in mind. The School is under renovation since last 4 years and is being over taken by a New Trust of Ahmedabad.   

Bhagwan Shree Rajneesh (Osho) had a meditation camp in may in 1970 in Nargol where he experienced with his then new "Dynamic meditation" -technique.

There is also a Shree Swaminarayan Mandir (temple) located in Nargol. The movement is led by Acharya 1008 Shree Tejendraprasadji Maharaj.

References

External links
 

Villages in Valsad district